Playing @ Work is a studio album by South African jazz trumpeter Hugh Masekela. The album was recorded in Pretoria and released in 2012 and then in 2013 as a reworked version.

Critical reception
Brendah Nyakudya of Afropolitan noted: "Any fan of Bra Hugh will be pleased with this album as it shows that the musical master still has a few tricks up his sleeve and continues to make music to please."

Track listing
"Africa Hold Hands" - 06:45
"It's All Over Now Baby Blue" - 07:39
"Go Look out for Mama (Umama Ugugile)" - 07:27
"Sugar Daddy (Ikhehla Lo M'Fana)" - 06:36
"Perlemoen" - 04:14
"Sista Fania" - 09:38
"Soul Rebel" - 06:14
"Soweto Blues" (feat. Pu2Ma) - 06:52
"Rekpete" - 05:24
"Mama" - 10:33

References

External links

2012 albums
Hugh Masekela albums